Penalty is a Brazilian sporting goods manufacturer established in 1970 in Sao Paulo. The brand is operated by its owner and creator, Grupo Cambucci.

The company manufactures mainly association football equipment such as kit uniforms and balls.

History

In 1945 the Assibe Brothers founded "Malharia Cambuci SA", a company of clothing for men and women in the neighborhood of Cambuci, in São Paulo. In 1970 the company created the brand "Penalty" launching products for football market.

In the 1980s, Penalty became the largest Brazilian manufacturer of balls. During this period, acquired the manufacturing rights for the brand Asics (shoes) and Wilson (tennis racquets). During the 1990s, successful Brazilian football teams Sao Paulo (that won the Copa Libertadores in 1992 and 1993) and Grêmio (in 1995) wore uniforms by Penalty.

In 1998 the brand expanded its business to Argentina opening a filial of the company there, signing deals with some local teams to be its uniform kit provider.

In 2010 Penalty started its sponsoring of the Spanish Futsal League and one year later the company signed an exclusive agreement with Víctor Valdés, the football goalkeeper of Barcelona FC and Spanish national team, for whom Penalty designed an exclusive boot.

Current sponsorships 
The following list that are sponsored by Penalty:

Association football

Associations 

  FPF
  Paulistão Série A 
  FCRF

Club teams 
 
  Amiral Quebec
  AC Nagano Parceiro
  Azul Claro Numazu
  Fagiano Okayama
  Giravanz Kitakyushu 
  Shonan Bellmare
  Montedio Yamagata
  Yamato Sylphid
  Radomiak Radom
  Albirex Niigata

Players 

  Branquinho
  Deola
  Elicarlos
  Lee
  Paulinho
  Rogério
  Serginho
  Ayaka Michigami
  Daisuke Kikuchi
  Junki Kanayama
  Junya Takahashi
  Kaishu Sano
  Katsumi Yusa
  Kazuya Okamura
  Kenta Fukumori
  Miharu Kobayashi
  Natsumi Ikegaya
  Tadashi Takeda
  Taisuke Akiyoshi
  Tetsuya Funatsu
  Shota Kobayashi
  Shuhei Matsubara
  SteviaEgbus Mikuni
  Walter Ibáñez
  Guillermo Reyes
  Juan Álvez
  Matias Castro
  Elías Ricardo Figueroa

Basketball

Associations 

  CABB (basketball)
  CBB (basketball)

Club teams 

  Haneda Vickies
  Iwate Big Bulls
  Kagoshima Rebnise
  Niigata Albirex BB Rabbits
  Yamagata Wyverns
  Yokohama Excellence

Futsal

Associations 

  LNF
  Futsal Canadian Championship 
  LNFS
  Ykkönen
  Futsal-Liiga

Club teams 

  Copagril
 Magnus
  Saitama Saicolo
  SWH Futsal Club
  ElPozo Murcia
  Santiago

Players 

  Bateria
  Eka
  Ana Amijo
  Hiroyuki Watai
  Yuki Hashimoto
  Misaki Kobayashi
  Ryutaro Tamura
  Fernandão

Super GT 
  GAINER.INC Team

Handball

Associations 

  CAH (handball)
  CBHb (handball)

Volleyball

Associations 
  FeVA

Past sponsorships

Association Football

Associations 

  FBF
  AUF

National Teams 

 Bhutan (2010)
 Bolivia (1977–79, 1983–86)
 Peru (1981–1982)

Club teams 

  Banfield (2014–2018)
  Gimnasia y Esgrima (2011–2017)
  Sarmiento (1995–96, 2016–19)
  Talleres de Córdoba (1994–95, 2005–08, 2011–19)
  Ceará
  Vitória
  Figueirense (2012–2014)
  Uberaba 
  Grêmio (1987–1999)
  Joinville (1997–2000)
  Paraná (2007–09)
  Paysandu (1979–91, 1997–2001)
  Santa Cruz (2009–2017)
  São Paulo (1974-77, 1991-95, 2000–02)
  Nagano Parceiro Ladies (2016–2021)
  Blaublitz Akita (2013–2014)
  FC Maruyasu Okazaki (2016–2018)
  Kawasaki Frontale (1997–1998)
  Tegevajaro Miyazaki (2015–2020)
  V-Varen Nagasaki (2012–2013)
  Chennai City FC (2018–2019)

Players 

  Alex
  Víctor Valdés
  Sergio Migliaccio

Futsal

National Teams 
 Brazil

Club teams 

 Intelli (1986-1987, 2004-2005, 2013-2018)

Volleyball

Association 
  Paraguayan Volleyball Federation (FPV)
  Uruguayan Volleyball Federation (FUV)

Club teams 
  Associação Social e Esportiva Sada

References

External links
 

Manufacturing companies based in São Paulo
Sporting goods manufacturers of Brazil
Sportswear brands
Brazilian brands
Athletic shoe brands
Clothing companies established in 1970
Companies listed on B3 (stock exchange)
Sporting goods brands
1970 establishments in Brazil